Dolls is a 2013 Malayalam drama film directed by Shalil Kallur. It stars John, Parvatii Nair and Jyothi Krishna in the lead roles. The film opened to negative reviews in March 2013.

Cast

John as Dr. Dilip
Jyothi Krishna as Dr. Remya
Bijukuttan as Viswambaran
Sadiq as Paramu Paniker
 Subi Suresh as Sisily Perera
 Rahul Ravi as Dr.Anoop (antagonist)
Geetha Vijayan
Parvathy Nair as Dr.Maya
Indrans as  Christefer Perera
Babu Namboothiri as Pisharadi
Kalasala Babu as Justice. Raghava Kaimal
Santhosh as Santhosh Varma
Rudraksh
Jagannatha Varma
Shanavas
Shenby
Shruti Nair
Maria John
Mahima
Omana Ouseph

Production
Shalil Kallur signed up models Shruti Nair and Maria John, who had participated in the Miss Kerala pageant, to appear in the film. However, after canning a few scenes, John left the project complaining that Kallur had misled her about the role in the film.

References

External links
 

2013 films
2010s Malayalam-language films